Summerville may refer to:

in Canada
Summerville, Newfoundland and Labrador, a settlement in Newfoundland
Summerville, Yarmouth County, Nova Scotia, a community

in South Africa 
 Summerville, Western Cape, a suburb of Kraaifontein

in the United States
Summerville, former name of Somersville, California, United States
Summerville, Georgia, city in Chattooga County, Georgia
Summerville (Augusta, Georgia), neighborhood and historic district in Augusta, Richmond County, Georgia
Summerville, Oregon, a city in Union County, Oregon
Summerville, Pennsylvania, a borough in Jefferson County, Pennsylvania
Summerville, South Carolina, a town mostly in Dorchester County, South Carolina

See also
Sommerville (disambiguation)
Summerfield (disambiguation)
Summersville (disambiguation)